Paradise (Ray) is a 2016 Russian drama film produced and directed by Andrei Konchalovsky. It was selected to compete for the Golden Lion at the 73rd Venice International Film Festival. At Venice Konchalovsky won the Silver Lion for Best Director. It was selected as the Russian entry for the Best Foreign Language Film at the 89th Academy Awards. In December 2016, it made the shortlist of nine films to be considered for a nomination at the 89th Academy Awards.

Plot
The film is built around the intertwining destinies of three main characters during the Second World War: aristocratic Russian émigré and member of the French Resistance Olga (Yuliya Vysotskaya), a French collaborator Jules (Philippe Duquesne), and a high-ranking SS officer Helmut (Christian Clauß).

Olga is arrested for hiding Jewish children from the Nazi roundups. Her case is overseen by Jules. He is interested in her and it seems that in exchange for sexual relations, he is ready to soften the fate of the prisoner, but this does not happen. A chimeric hope of freedom is replaced by cruel reality – Olga lands in a German concentration camp. There she meets Helmut, who in the past was hopelessly in love with her. Strange and painful relations commence between them.

The Nazis are already close to defeat, and Helmut decides to save Olga from the camp and run away with her to South America. Olga, having lost hope of freedom agrees, but at the last moment realizes that her idea of paradise has changed.

Cast
 Yuliya Vysotskaya as Olga
 Christian Clauß as Helmut
 Philippe Duquesne as Jules
 Peter Kurth as Krause
 Jakob Diehl as Vogel
 Viktor Sukhorukov as Heinrich Himmler
 Vera Voronkova as Rosa

Reception

Critical response
Paradise has an approval rating of 70% on review aggregator website Rotten Tomatoes, based on 23 reviews, and an average rating of 7.50/10.The website's critical consensus states, "Paradise hits hard and lingers, although viewers who've seen a number of other Holocaust-set dramas may find it all a bit familiar". It also has a score of 52 out of 100 on Metacritic, based on 7 critics, indicating "mixed or average reviews".

Accolades

See also
 List of submissions to the 89th Academy Awards for Best Foreign Language Film
 List of Russian submissions for the Academy Award for Best Foreign Language Film

References

External links
 
 

2016 films
2016 drama films
2010s German-language films
2010s Russian-language films
Russian drama films
Russian black-and-white films
German drama films
German black-and-white films
Films directed by Andrei Konchalovsky
German World War II films
Cultural depictions of Heinrich Himmler
Russian World War II films
2010s German films